Sengalipuram Vaidhyanatha Deekshithar , also Sengalipuram Muthanna or Muthannaval (1830–1893), was a great guru from the family of Dikshitar from Sengalipuram near Paruthiyur, on the northern banks of the Kudamurutti River, in Thiruvarur District of Tamil Nadu. 

Sengalipuram was "Shivakalipuram" as it is known in the Shastras, where hundreds of Dikshithar families are living for generations up to today and where great saints like Sri Muthannaval and scholars like Sri Anantharama Deekshithar were born. Sri Vaidhyanatha Dikshitar was known as Periya Muthannaval in the village while his brother Subbarama Dikshitar was called Chinna Muthannaval.

Life

Sengalipuram Muthannaval was a famous teacher in the area and had a lot of young students in his Gurukul.  Muthannaval was a Guru with a great deal of patience who knew that little steps in learning go a long way. He loved to make students comfortable so that the students enjoyed having him as their teacher and looked forward to come to the classes each day. He created a non-threatening, welcoming environment that nurtured each of the students. He understood students and knew what motivates them and how to scaffold activities to ensure that maximum learning occurred. He easily built relationships with his students as well as their parents. He was a lifelong learner committed to his profession.  He ensured that all students reach their maximum potential. He constantly strove to 'reach and teach' every student under his care. Such was the reputation of Muthannaval.

Teachings

Muthannaval taught prose, poetry, grammar, kavyam, natakam, alankaram and Veda shastra and Vedanta.  In Vedic recitals the same verses in the Four Vedas were recited in four different ways as some alphabets or accents changed. The pronunciations for each of the prayers and texts for rituals are considered very important to gain full benefit of the rituals. A generalized standard method of recitation and pronunciation of Vedic texts was derived from the ancient times. Vedic prayers were generally recited in the same way over generations, from teacher to students following certain basic rules of pronunciations and grammar. These rules are given in the Vedas themselves and in certain texts referred to as Vedangas. Every day Muthannaval trained his students to do Rama Nama and Hari Nama Sankirthanam and bhajans.

Disciples

One of Muthannaval's famous disciples was Paruthiyur Krishna Sastri. Sastri came to Muthanaval as a student at the age of seven. "Jayamangala Stothamala" (chapter 8, quoted by Pattabhirama Sastri) shows Krishna Sastri remembering his Guru Muthanna in many of the verses he had composed. Sastri's first lesson with his Guru Muthanna described in the article was from a chapter in Raghuvamsa, the great work of the poet Kalidasa, where the King Raghu performs the Vishwajit sacrifice and donates all that he has to a poor student Kaustha for paying fees to his Guru. Muthanna was happy that Sastri started the class that day and said "Like the king Raghu in the lesson, who was able to conquer Kubera, the Lord of wealth, and shower upon the poor student the amount of riches he could have never imagined, you will also amass a lot of wealth and knowledge and help many needy people".  The blessings came true. Muthanna Sastri encouraged him to conduct discourses in the Ramayana and presented him with a "Srimad Ramayana" book. It was with this Guru's blessings and encouragement that Krishna Sastri became the greatest exponent of the Ramayana of his time.

Krishna Sastri dedicated his Nandhi Mangala Slokas to his Guru Muthannaval. When Muthanna attained siddhi in 1893, Sastri conducted "Sri Muthanna Aradhana" every year in memory of his Guru. He performed "Soma Yagam" in Srirangam, "Adhirathram Yagam" in his Paruthiyur Kodandarama Temple along with other disciples of Muthannaval.

Another famous student of Muthannaval was Sri Sengalipuram Anantarama Dikshitar's father, Subramanya Dikshitar. He was a Śrauti scholar and also was a great exponent of the art of upanyasas (discourses) on various subjects in Hinduism. He was also the brother of Muthannaval.

Life style

Muthannaval had great talent in counselling and advising people. He always went out of the way to help people. He always spoke sweetly and kindly. He was extremely patient in his dealings. Above all his devotion to God-Bakthi was incomparable. Many people came to visit him from time to time to listen to his Dharma Sastram. He taught and prescribed them different shlokas and mantras as a remedy for their problems. He never discriminated against anybody. He listened to everyone from any caste right from poor villagers, to farmers and Harijans. He exhibited genuine concern to others' problems and prayed for them. He gave them whatever he could to help them. He visited temples specially to pray for others' problems. When Sastri moved out of that place these people even used to worship the soil he had trodden on. They used to come back to thank and pay their respects to Muthannaval when their problems were resolved.

Last years

Shri Muthannaval was keen on taking up Abat Sanyasam. His relations and disciples were saddened by his decision. In early 1893, Muthannaval had a brief illness. Doctors who tested him said that his pulse was good and he would recover soon. Disciples told him that Sanyasam was not necessary for him and he would recover and live long.  But Muthannaval predicted that on Dhuvadasi day at around 15 hours he would die. When his wife Nagalakshmi had gone to the Kaveri, Muthannaval took Abatsanyasam. He said that if he survived and lived after Dhuvadasi day, he would leave Sengalipuram and move to Paruthiyur to live near his favourite student Krishna Sastri. But that did not happen. In the month of Thai, on Dhuvadasi day at 15 hours, as predicted by him he died at the age of 63.

Muthanna maintained great relations with his students throughout his life. He was very proud of their scholarship and achievements and he encouraged them a lot. Both the Guru Sengalipuram Muthannaval and Krishna Sastri died in the month of Thai, Krishna Paksham, Dhuvadasi day.

References

External  links

 Sarvam Rama Mayam
  Ramayanam Sastrigal 
  Paruthiyur Krishna Sastri 
   Subhakariam
  Sengalipuram Vittaldas
   The Hindu

1830 births
1893 deaths
19th-century Hindu religious leaders